Bennis is a surname. Notable people with the surname include:

Ahmed Bennis (1914–2009), Moroccan chess master
Edward Bennis, the head football coach for the Villanova University Wildcats football team in 1916
Elizabeth Bennis (1725–1802), an Irish Methodist activist and diarist
Mohammed Bennis, Moroccan poet and one of the most important poets of Modern Arabic Poetry
Phil Bennis (born 1942), retired Irish hurling manager and former player
Phyllis Bennis (born 1951), American writer and activist
Richie Bennis (born 1945), retired Irish hurling manager and former player
Susan Bennis, shoe designer and co-founder of the Susan Dennis/Warren Edwards brand
Warren Bennis (born 1925), American scholar, organizational consultant and author, and pioneer of Leadership studies

See also
Benni, a given name and surname
Bennis v. Michigan, 516 U.S. 442 (1996), decision by the United States Supreme Court, which held that innocent owner defense is not constitutionally mandated by Fourteenth Amendment Due Process in cases of civil forfeiture
Benis, a village in Iran also written as "Bennis"